This is a list of records and statistics of the football tournament in the Olympic games ever since the inaugural edition in 1996.

Medal table

Top scorers

All-time top scorers
The all-time top goalscorers with at least 5 goals (since 1996)

Top scorers by tournament

Winning coaches

Fair play award

General statistics by tournament

Teams: tournament position
Teams having equal quantities in the tables below are ordered by the tournament the quantity was attained in (the teams that attained the quantity first are listed first). If the quantity was attained by more than one team in the same tournament, these teams are ordered alphabetically.

 Most titles won 4,  (1996, 2004, 2008, 2012).
 Most finishes in the top two 5, .
 Most finishes in the top three 6,  (all but 2016).
 Most finishes in the top four 6,  (all but 2016)
 Most appearances 7,  (all tournaments)

Consecutive
 Most consecutive championships 3,  (2004–2012).
 Most consecutive finishes in the top two 5,  (1996–2012).
 Most consecutive finishes in the top three 5,  (1996–2012).

Gaps
 Longest gap between successive titles 8 years,  (1996–2004).

Host team
 Best finish by host team Champion:  (1996).
 Worst finish by host team 10th position:  (2004).

Other
 Most finishes in the top two without ever being champion 2,  (2004, 2008),  (2016, 2020).
 Most finishes in the top three without ever being champion 2,  (2004, 2008),  (2016, 2020).
 Most finishes in the top four without ever being champion 5,  (1996, 2000, 2004, 2008, 2016).
 Most finishes in the top four without ever finishing in the top two 1,  (2012),  (2020).

Coaches: tournament position
 Most championships 2, Pia Sundhage (2008-2012).

Teams: matches played and goals scored

All time
Source
 Most matches played 38, .
 Most wins 27, .
 Most losses 12, .
 Most draws 8, .
 Most goals scored 76, .
 Most hat-tricks scored 2, .
 Most goals conceded 34, .
 Fewest goals scored 0, .
 Fewest goals conceded 7, .
 Highest goal difference +40, .
 Lowest goal difference -12, .
 Highest average of goals scored per match 2.00, .
 Highest average of goals conceded per match 5.00, .

Individual
 Most tournaments played 7, Formiga (1996–2020).
 Most medals 4, Christie Rampone (2000–2012).
 Most matches played, finals 33, Formiga (1996–2016).
 Most matches won 19, Christie Rampone (2000–2012).
 Youngest player , Ellie Carpenter, vs Zimbabwe, 9 August 2016.
 Oldest player , Formiga, vs Canada, 30 July 2021.

Goalscoring

Individual
 Most goals scored, overall finals 14, Cristiane, 2004–2016.
 Most goals scored in a tournament 10, Vivianne Miedema, 2020.
 Most goals scored in a match 4, Birgit Prinz, vs China, 2004; Vivianne Miedema vs Zambia, 2020.
 Most goals scored in a lost match 3, Christine Sinclair,, vs United States, 2012; Barbra Banda,, vs Netherlands, 2020.
 Most goals scored in a final match 2, Tiffeny Milbrett, vs Norway, 2000; Carli Lloyd, vs Japan, 2012.
 Most goals scored in all final matches 3, Tiffeny Milbrett, 1 vs China in 1996 & 2 vs Norway in 2000; Carli Lloyd, 1 vs Brazil in 2008 & 2 vs Japan in 2012.
 Fastest hat-trick 14 minutes, Cristiane, scored at 34', 35' and 45+3', vs Nigeria, 2008.
 Most hat-tricks 2, Cristiane, 2004-2008; Barbra Banda, 2020
 Youngest hat-trick scorer , Cristiane, vs Greece, 17 August 2004.
 Youngest goalscorer, final , Stina Blackstenius, vs Germany, 19 August 2016.
 Oldest hat-trick scorer , Christine Sinclair, vs United States, 6 August 2012.
 Oldest goalscorer, final , Carli Lloyd, vs Japan, 9 August 2012.
 Most penalties scored (excluding during shootouts) 2, Perpetua Nkwocha, 1 each in 2000 & 2008.

Team
 Biggest margin of victory 8,  (8) vs  (0), 2004.
 Most goals scored in a match, one team 10,  vs , 2020.
 Most goals scored in a match, both teams 13,  (10) vs  (3), 2020.

Tournament

 Most goals scored in a tournament 71 goals, 2012.
 Fewest goals scored in a tournament 42 goals, 2000.
 Most goals per match in a tournament 3.31 goals per match, 1996.
 Fewest goals per match in a tournament 2.54 goals per match, 2008, 2016.

Coaching
 Most final appearances as head coach 3, Pia Sundhage, ( 2008 & 2012,  2016), John Herdman ( 2008,  2012 & 2016).

 Most final appearances as player and head coach 4, Pia Sundhage, ( 1996 as player and 2016 as coach;  2008 & 2012 as coach).

Discipline

 Most sendings off (match, both teams) 2,  (1) vs  (1), 1996.
 Most cautions (match, both teams) 8,  (4) vs  (4), 2000.

Attendance
 Highest attendance in a match 80,203,  vs , 9 August 2012, Wembley Stadium, London, 2012.
 Highest attendance in a final 80,203,  vs , 9 August 2012, Wembley Stadium, London, 2012.
 Lowest attendance in a match 1,418,  vs , 20 August 2004, Kaftanzoglio Stadium, Thessaloniki, 2004.
 Highest average of attendance per match 43,235, 1996.
 Highest attendance in a tournament 740,014, 2008.
 Lowest average of attendance per match 10,432, 2004.
 Lowest attendance in a tournament 208,637, 2004.

See also
 List of men's Olympic football tournament records

References

Olympic football records and statistics
Women's sport-related lists